Kelmis is a municipality located in the Belgian province of Liège, named for the historical deposits of calamine (zinc ore) nearby.

The municipality consists of the following sub-municipalities: Kelmis proper, Hergenrath, and Neu-Moresnet.

The territory around the Vieille Montagne zinc mine in Kelmis was Neutral Moresnet, a neutral condominium of the Netherlands and Prussia (later Belgium and Germany) from 1816 to 1919, with the Mayor of Kelmis nominated by two commissioners from the neighbouring countries. Although there were attempts by locals at making it evolve into a fully independent microstate, all of them were thwarted and it remained under double-sovereignty and neutrality until its eventual annexation by Belgium after the First World War.

There is a war memorial to German soldiers from Kelmis who were killed during the Franco-Prussian War, located in the Aachener Strasse, and one to inhabitants of Kelmis who were killed in the First and Second World Wars, located in the Kirchplatz (French: Place de l'Église).

A small museum in Kelmis, the Museum Vieille Montagne, includes exhibits on Neutral Moresnet. Of the 60 border markers for the territory, more than 50 are still standing.

In the nineteenth century a Low Dietsch dialect was spoken in Kelmis. Today Kelmis is German-speaking. It has facilities for French speakers and is one of the nine municipalities of the German‑speaking Community of Belgium.

See also
 List of protected heritage sites in Kelmis

References

External links
 
 
 

 
Capitals of former nations
Neutral Moresnet